Joyce Williams may refer to:

Joyce Jacobs (1922–2013), sometimes credited as Joyce Williams
Joy Williams (Australian writer) (1942–2006), also known as Joyce Williams
Joyce Williams (actress), Playboy Bunny who portrays a character in Pretty Maids All in a Row
Joyce Williams (tennis), Scottish tennis player
Joyce D. Williams, actress who portrays Sarah Brown in Meet the Browns